Navrang Lal Tibrewal (born 17 January 1937 in Jhunjhunu district, Rajasthan) is an Indian judge and former acting Governor of Rajasthan. He has also served as the acting Chief Justice of the Rajasthan High Court. He completed his early education  from Jhunjhunu, Graduation from Maharaja College, Jaipur, LL.B. from University Law College in 1959. After completion of training from 6 months as senior lawyer, Tibrewal started legal practice at Jhunjhunu district and subordinate courts and after 6 years he shifted to Jodhpur High Court in 1965. After 32 years in 1997 after establishment of Jaipur High Court he shifted to Jaipur. He was elected as a Chairman of Rajasthan Bar Council in 1982. He was appointed high court judge on July 20, 1990, and took charge as its acting chief justice on April 10 after the retirement of the then acting chief justice, M P Singh. He served as Chairman Legal Aid Service board for 6 years. He became acting Chief Justice of Rajasthan High Court in 1998. He became acting Governor of Rajasthan State in place of Darbara Singh on 25 May 1998. Presently he is chairman of various educational institutions, 1 in Jaipur and 3 institutions in Jhunjhunu. His father's name is Ladu Ram Tiberwal.

References

Governors of Rajasthan
People from Jhunjhunu district
Rajasthani people
Chief Justices of the Rajasthan High Court
1937 births
Living people
20th-century Indian judges